Engelhardtia ursina is the only species in the  monotypic moth genus Engelhardtia of the family Noctuidae. The genus was erected by William Barnes and Foster Hendrickson Benjamin in 1923 and the species was first described by John B. Smith in 1898. It is known from the US state of Colorado.

References

Hadeninae
Monotypic moth genera